David Andrew Skinns (born 1 February 1982) is an English professional golfer.

Skinns was born in Lincoln, England. He was the losing finalist in the 2000 Boys Amateur Championship. He attended the University of Tennessee and majored in psychology.

Skinns competed on the NGA Hooters Tour and won seven times on the tour between 2008 and 2012. He played in a number of event on the Web.com Tour in 2012 and 2014 and on the PGA Tour Canada in 2013, 2015 and 2016.

In 2017, Skinns started the season Web.com Tour season finale 115th on the money list. A T2 at the WinCo Foods Portland Open moved him to 58th. Skinns failed to earn a PGA Tour card, but was guaranteed full Web.com Tour status for the first time in his career. The next year, Skinns earned his first win on a major professional tour at the Pinnacle Bank Championship. He fell short again of qualifying for the PGA Tour, finishing 41st on the regular season money list and outside the top 25 in the Finals. Skinns won the same event in 2021, but this time, his win was enough to earn him a PGA Tour card.

Professional wins (9)

Korn Ferry Tour wins (2)

Korn Ferry Tour playoff record (0–1)

NGA Hooters Tour wins (7)
2008 Dothan Classic, First-Tee Inverrary Country Club Open, Base Camp Realty/Chesdin Landing Open
2011 River Islands Golf Club Classic
2012 Cutter Creek Golf Classic, Three Ridges NGA Knoxville Classic, NGA Tour Classic at Achasta
Source:

Team appearances
Amateur
Men's Home Internationals (representing England): 2000 – 2006
European Youths' Team Championship (representing England): 2002
Palmer Cup (representing Europe): 2003 (winners), 2005

See also
2021 Korn Ferry Tour Finals graduates

References

External links

English male golfers
PGA Tour golfers
Tennessee Volunteers men's golfers
Sportspeople from Lincoln, England
1982 births
Living people